"I'll Still Kill" (edited for radio as "Still Will") is a song by American hip hop recording artist 50 Cent, released as the fifth single from his third album Curtis (2007). The song, which was produced by DJ Khalil, features guest vocals from Senegalese-American singer Akon. The single officially hit airwaves on November 6, 2007. The song peaked at number 95 on the US Billboard Hot 100 chart.

Background
The song was originally produced for rapper Bishop Lamont, who titled the song, "Down". Lamont's version contained chorus vocals by Kobe. The song was dropped (but later leaked), and the beat was given to 50 Cent, who substituted Akon's rewritten hook for Kobe's vocals in the song.

Both 50 Cent and Akon spoke highly of the collaboration, in which 50 Cent exclaimed,  Akon shared more of the same thoughts,  50 Cent has since been seen working with Akon in his studio for his upcoming 5th studio album "The Return Of The Heartless Monster". Though the single was expected to be a hit, it had only peaked at #95 on The Billboard Hot 100 and #52 on Hot R&B/Hip-Hop Songs, probably due to it being release months after the album already release, as well as the video being banned from BET and MTV. Snippets of Akon's vocals are sampled by DJ Premier in "Ain't Nuttin Changed" for Blaq Poet.

Music video
The music video was directed by Jessy Terrero, who commented on the video shoot. He said:  The video is based around 50 Cent who has to "handle himself in a world of trained killers". In an interview with MTV, Akon commented on the video and said:  The video premiered via BET on November 12, 2007. According to 50 Cent on his Shade 45 Interview on December 9, 2007, it was banned on the network. He criticized BET for showing American Gangster and The Wire, but not his video. In the music video, the song is edited more than the original, with Akon saying "I still will kill" is changed to "I still will chill", and some of the more violent words being replaced with different words. The song and video has over 30 million views on YouTube.

Track listing
 2-Track
 "Still Will" (clean version)
 "Curtis 187"

 Maxi CD
 "Still Will" (clean version)
 "I'll Still Kill" (explicit version)
 "Curtis 187"
 "Still Will" (CD-rom video)

Chart positions

References

50 Cent songs
Akon songs
2007 singles
Music videos directed by Jessy Terrero
Songs written by Akon
Songs written by 50 Cent
Shady Records singles
Aftermath Entertainment singles
Interscope Records singles
Gangsta rap songs
Song recordings produced by DJ Khalil
2007 songs
Songs written by DJ Khalil